Dolichoderus semiorbis is a species of ant in Dolichoderus. Described by Shattuck and Marsden in 2013, the species is endemic to Australia.

References

Dolichoderus
Hymenoptera of Australia
Insects described in 2013